Hiley Royal Bamsey (8 October 1916 – 31 December 1943) was an English amateur footballer who played in the Football League for Exeter City as a centre half.

Personal life 
Bamsey served as a sergeant in the Royal Electrical and Mechanical Engineers during the Second World War and was killed in Iraq on 31 December 1943. He was buried in Khayat Beach War Cemetery, near Haifa.

References 

English footballers

1916 births
1943 deaths
Footballers from Devon
English Football League players
Association football inside forwards
Barrow A.F.C. players
British Army personnel killed in World War II
Royal Electrical and Mechanical Engineers soldiers
Military personnel from Devon